William Wiseman may refer to:

Sir William Wiseman, 1st Baronet (1629–1688), English landowner and politician
Sir William Wiseman, 8th Baronet (1814–1874), British naval officer
Sir William Wiseman, 10th Baronet (1885–1962), grandson of the above, head of Secret Intelligence Service in Washington, DC during the First World War
William Wiseman (sheriff of Elgin), 13th–14th century Scottish nobleman and the Sheriff of Elgin
Willie Wiseman (1896–1979), Scottish footballer (Queen's Park and Scotland)

See also
Wiseman baronets
William Wise (disambiguation)